Siegfried Gasser (16 July 1941 – 2 May 2022) was an Austrian politician. A member of the Austrian People's Party, he served as governor of Vorarlberg from 1984 to 1990. He died on 2 May 2022 at the age of 80.

References

1941 births
2022 deaths
20th-century Austrian politicians
Austrian People's Party politicians
Governors of Vorarlberg
University of Innsbruck alumni
People from Saarlouis (district)